Silvano Moro (28 December 1927 – 14 April 2008) was an Italian association football manager and footballer who played as a defender. On 23 March 1958, he represented the Italy national football team on the occasion of a friendly match against Austria in a 3–2 away loss.

Honours

Player
Vicenza
Serie B: 1954–55

References

1927 births
2008 deaths
Italian footballers
Italy international footballers
Association football defenders
Serie A players
Serie B players
Udinese Calcio players
A.C. Milan players
Calcio Padova players
L.R. Vicenza players
Treviso F.B.C. 1993 players
S.S. Chieti Calcio players
Atalanta B.C. managers
U.S. Cremonese managers
Italian football managers
A.S. Pro Gorizia players